The 1970 European Cup final was a football match held at the San Siro, Milan, on 6 May 1970, that saw Feijenoord of the Netherlands defeat Celtic of Scotland 2–1 after extra time. Ove Kindvall's goal in the 117th minute meant the trophy was won by a Dutch club for the first time. It remains Feyenoord's only European Cup triumph.

For losing finalists Celtic, this marked the second – and to date most recent – European Cup final appearance in club history, after the famous win by the "Lisbon Lions" side in the 1967 edition. The match nearly never took place due to massive strikes throughout Italy during 1970; the Italian Football Federation backed down to ensure that their own clubs would be able to compete in further UEFA competitions.

Route to the final

Match

Summary
In contrast to their win in the European Cup final three years prior, in which they had gone into the match as heavy underdogs against Inter, this time around, Celtic entered the final as strong favourites. However, despite Tommy Gemmell opening the scoring after 30 minutes, they were comprehensively outplayed by Feyenoord. The Dutch team's manager, Ernst Happel, ensured Celtic winger Jimmy Johnstone was double marked at all times, whilst the midfield trio of Franz Hasil, Willem van Hanegem and Wim Jansen dominated their Celtic counterparts. Rinus Israël quickly equalised with his head, the first Feyenoord-goal in this campaign scored outside their home stadium. Celtic managed to hold on at 1–1 to force extra time. With just a few minutes of extra-time remaining, a long free-kick from the Feyenoord half was sent towards the Celtic penalty area. Celtic defender and captain Billy McNeill stumbled and misjudged the ball, and as he tried to recover he appeared to punch the ball away. Before the referee had a chance to award a penalty, Ove Kindvall reacted quickly, running on and chipping the ball over the advancing goalkeeper Evan Williams to seal a 2–1 win for Feyenoord.

Details

See also
1969–70 European Cup
Celtic F.C. in European football

Notes

References

External links
European Cup results at Rec.Sport.Soccer Statistics Foundation
1969-70 season at UEFA website
European Cup History 1970

1
European Cup Final 1970
European Cup Final 1970
European Cup Final 1970
1970
European Cup Final
European Cup Final
Football in Milan
May 1970 sports events in Europe
1970s in Milan
Sports competitions in Milan